State Route 159 (SR 159) is a  east–west highway in Clark County, Nevada, United States, providing access to Red Rock Canyon and serving as a thoroughfare in the Las Vegas metropolitan area. A portion of the west end of the route is designated a Nevada Scenic Byway.

Route description

State Route 159 has two distinct segments. The first segment is a rural two-lane highway that begins at its junction with SR 160. The highway proceeds northwest through the town of Blue Diamond towards Spring Mountain Ranch State Park. From there, the highway curves northeast around Red Rock Canyon to the Las Vegas city limits west of the Las Vegas Beltway. This segment of SR 159 is known on maps and signs as Blue Diamond Road (assuming the name from SR 160), but is also referred to as Red Rock Canyon Road.

As SR 159 enters the city of Las Vegas, it transitions into Charleston Boulevard, a major east–west section line arterial bisecting the Las Vegas Valley. The highway crosses the Las Vegas Beltway and runs through the planned community of Summerlin. SR 159 continues east to intersect Interstate 15 and then passes south of Downtown Las Vegas. From there, the highway ventures further east to intersect Interstate 515 and U.S. Routes 93 and 95 before reaching its terminus at Nellis Boulevard (SR 612). (Charleston Boulevard itself ends about three miles (5 km) east of Nellis Boulevard near Frenchman Mountain.)

History

A portion of Charleston Boulevard was previously designated U.S. Route 95 Alternate to bypass Downtown Las Vegas. The designation began at Fremont Street (SR 582) and continued west to Rancho Drive (SR 599), where it curved north to reconnect to US 95. The alternate route was discontinued in 1982.

Approximately  of SR 159 in Red Rock Canyon was designated a Nevada Scenic Byway on June 30, 1995.

Major intersections

Public Transport
Current RTC route 206 functions on this road.

See also

 List of state highways in Nevada

References

External links

159
159
Streets in the Las Vegas Valley
U.S. Route 95